Robert Adams Gottlieb (born April 29, 1931) is an American writer and editor. He has been editor-in-chief of Simon & Schuster, Alfred A. Knopf, and The New Yorker.

Early life and education
Robert Gottlieb was born to a Jewish family in New York City in 1931 and grew up in Manhattan. During his childhood, he "was your basic, garden-variety, ambitious, upwardly mobile, hard-working Jewish boy from Brooklyn. I was bound to go beyond my parents. It was simply the way things were."  His middle name was given to him in honor of his uncle, Arthur Adams, who is now known to have been a Soviet spy.

Gottlieb graduated from Columbia University in 1952, and then spent two years at Cambridge University before joining Simon & Schuster in 1955.

Career
Gottlieb joined Simon & Schuster in 1955 as an editorial assistant to Jack Goodman, the editor-in-chief. Within ten years he himself became the editor-in-chief. At that publisher, Gottlieb's most notable discovery, which he edited, was Catch-22, by the then-unknown Joseph Heller. It was Gottlieb who suggested the number 22 for the title instead of 18; Leon Uris's Mila 18 was to be published around the same time. 

In 1968, Gottlieb along with Nina Bourne and Anthony Schulte, moved to Alfred A. Knopf as editor-in-chief; soon after he became president. He left in 1987 to succeed William Shawn as editor of The New Yorker, staying in that position until 1992. After his departure from The New Yorker, Gottlieb returned to Alfred A. Knopf as editor ex officio.

Gottlieb has been a frequent contributor to The New York Review of Books, The New Yorker, and The New York Times Book Review, and has been the dance critic for The New York Observer since 1999. He is the author of biographies of George Balanchine, Sarah Bernhardt, and the family of Charles Dickens, as well as of a collection of his critical essays. A Certain Style, Gottlieb's lavishly illustrated book about the plastic handbags of which he was a major collector, was published by Alfred A. Knopf. He edited three major anthologies: Reading Jazz, Reading Dance, and (with Robert Kimball) Reading Lyrics.

Gottlieb suffered some ignominy for rejecting A Confederacy of Dunces by John Kennedy Toole, a book that later won the Pulitzer Prize when it was published posthumously after the author's suicide.

Gottlieb's autobiography, Avid Reader: A Life, was published in September 2016.

Editing

Gottlieb has edited novels by John Cheever, Doris Lessing, Chaim Potok, Charles Portis, Salman Rushdie, John Gardner, Len Deighton, John le Carré, Ray Bradbury, Elia Kazan, Margaret Drabble, Michael Crichton, Mordecai Richler and Toni Morrison, and non-fiction books by Bill Clinton, Janet Malcolm, Katharine Graham, Nora Ephron, Katharine Hepburn, Barbara Tuchman, Jessica Mitford, Robert Caro, Antonia Fraser, Lauren Bacall, Liv Ullmann, Paul Simon, Bob Dylan, Bruno Bettelheim, Carl Schorske, and many others.

In a 1994 interview with The Paris Review, Gottlieb described his need to "surrender" to a book. "The more you have surrendered," he said, "the more jarring its errors appear. I read a manuscript very quickly, the moment I get it. I usually won't use a pencil the first time through because I'm just reading for impressions. When I read the end, I'll call the writer and say, I think it's very fine (or whatever), but I think there are problems here and here. At that point I don't know why I think that—I just think it. Then I go back and read the manuscript again, more slowly, and I find and mark the places where I had negative reactions to try to figure out what's wrong. The second time through I think about solutions—maybe this needs expanding, maybe there's too much of this so it's blurring that."

Dance
For many years Gottlieb was associated with New York City Ballet, serving as a member of its board of directors. He has published many books by people from the dance world, including Mikhail Baryshnikov and Margot Fonteyn. He is also a member of the Board of Trustees of the Miami City Ballet.

Personal 
Gottlieb married Muriel Higgins in 1952; they had one child, Roger. In 1969, Gottlieb married Maria Tucci, an actress whose father, the novelist Niccolò Tucci, was one of Gottlieb's writers. They have two children: Lizzie Gottlieb, a film director, and Nicholas (Nicky), who is the subject of one of his sister's documentary films, Today's Man.

Legacy 
2022 saw the release of a documentary about the collaborations of Gottlieb and writer Robert Caro titled Turn Every Page. It was directed by Gottlieb's daughter, Lizzie Gottlieb. The title comes from advice from then-editor of Newsday, Alan Hathway, had given to Caro as a young reporter on "his first investigative assignment, Hathway 'looked at me for what I remember as a very long time … "Just remember", he said. "Turn every page. Never assume anything. Turn every goddamn page".'"

Bibliography

Nonfiction books
A Certain Style: The Art of the Plastic Handbag 1949-1959 (1988) (Knopf)
George Ballanchine: The Ballet Maker (2004) (Atlas Books/Harper Collins)
Sarah: The Life of Sarah Bernhardt (2010) (Yale University Press)
Lives and Letters (2011) (Farrar, Straus and Giroux)
Great Expectations: The Sons and Daughters of Charles Dickens (2012) (Farrar, Straus and Giroux)
Avid Reader: A Life (2016) (Farrar, Straus and Giroux)
Near-Death Experiences . . . and Others (2018) (Farrar, Straus and Giroux)
Garbo (2021) (Farrar, Straus and Giroux)

Other nonfiction

References

Further reading
Booklist
October 15, 1996, Bonnie Smothers, review of Reading Jazz: A Gathering of Autobiography, Reportage, and Criticism from 1919 to Now, p. 395
November 1, 2008, Donna Seaman, review of Reading Dance: A Gathering of Memoirs, Reportage, Criticism, Profiles, Interviews, and Some Uncategorizable Extras, p. 20
May 1, 2011, Donna Seaman, review of Lives and Letters, p. 54.
Choice: Current Reviews for Academic Libraries
May 2001, Review J. Farrington, review of Reading Lyrics, p. 1604
May 2005, S. E. Friedler, review of George Balanchine: The Ballet Maker, p. 1600
April 2009, T. K. Hagood, review of Reading Dance, p. 1511
April 2011, D. B. Wilmeth, review of Sarah: The Life of Sarah Bernhardt, p. 1485
Commonweal, March 28, 1997, Frank McConnell, review of Reading Jazz, p. 23
Interview, December 1996, Ingrid Sischy, "Jazz Writ Large," pp. 34–36
Library Journal
September 15, 1991, Lesley Jorbin, review of The Journals of John Cheever, p. 76
November 1, 1996, Michael Colby, review of Reading Jazz, p. 70
August 2000, Barry Zaslow, review of Reading Lyrics, p. 107
October 1, 2008, Barbara Kundanis, review of Reading Dance, p. 72
June 1, 2011, David Keymer, review of Lives and Letters, p. 98
New York Times
July 1, 1992, Deirdre Carmody, "Tina Brown to Take Over at The New Yorker"
December 9, 1992, Eric Pace, "William Shawn, 85, Is Dead"
New York Times Book Review
December 22, 1996, Peter Keepnews, review of Reading Jazz
September 17, 2010, Emma Brockes, review of Sarah
The Observer (London, England), October 24, 2010, Olivia Laing, review of Sarah
The Telegraph (London, England), October 22, 2010, Claudia FitzHerbert, review of Sarah.

External links
 Gottlieb's author page and archive 

1931 births
Living people
American magazine editors
Columbia College (New York) alumni
American dance critics
American male journalists
Jewish American writers
The New Yorker people
The New Yorker editors
Journalists from New York City
Catch-22
21st-century American Jews